Franklin Monroe High School is a public high school in Pitsburg, Ohio. It is the only high school in the Franklin Monroe School District. The school name is derived from the fact that it serves large portions of Franklin Township and Monroe Township in Darke County. Franklin Monroe began in 1952, when the Franklin and Monroe Township schools consolidated into one. The school is housed in one building on a property in Pitsburg, Ohio.

Notes and references

External links
 District Website

High schools in Darke County, Ohio
Public high schools in Ohio